Param Singh is an Indian actor best known for his role of Randhir Singh Shekhawat in the youth TV Series Sadda Haq: My Life, My Choice on Channel V, Rangeela in Ghulaam on Life Ok and Ahaan Veer Malhotra in Ishk Par Zor Nahi on  Sony TV

Career
Singh started his career through many commercials and with a short role in Parvarrish – Kuchh Khattee Kuchh Meethi.He rose to fame with his work in the youth-based TV Series Sadda Haq (TV series) in 2013 where he played the role of Randhir Singh Shekhawat,which aired on Channel V India  produced by Inspire Films.

In 2017 he did a show for Life OK named Ghulaam where he essayed the lead character Rangeela, opposite Niti Taylor and Vikas Manaktala.

Later, Singh played Dhruv Narang for Beyond Originals' web series called "Black Coffee", created by Yash A Patnaik and Mamta Patnaik.He has done a lot of plays back in school and college like Helen Of Troy. Ardhanareshwar is another play he has added as a feather to his hat.

In 2018 he played Fawad Ashraf in Star Plus's show Mariam Khan - Reporting Live but the show ended in early 2019 due to low TRPs. In August 2019 he signed Balaji Telefilms show Haiwaan : The Monster which aired on Zee TV opposite Ridhima Pandit. He portrayed Randhir Agnihotri a young, fun loving but smart scientist. The show ended on 16 February 2020.
He was last seen in one of the recent popular TV show, Sony TV's Ishk Par Zor Nahi'' as Ahaan Veer Malhotra opposite Akshita mudgal.

Television

Web series

Short films

References

External links

1988 births
Living people
People from Uttar Pradesh